Haliclona elegans is a species of demosponge in the family Chalinidae. It is found off south-eastern Australia.

References

External links 

  
 Haliclona elegans at the World Register of Marine Species (WoRMS)

elegans
Sponges described in 1887
Sponges of Australia